Carex superata is a tussock-forming species of perennial sedge in the family Cyperaceae. It is native to south eastern parts of the United States.

See also
List of Carex species

References

superata
Plants described in 1998
Flora of Florida
Flora of Alabama
Flora of Georgia (U.S. state)
Flora of Mississippi
Flora of Kentucky
Flora of South Carolina
Flora of Tennessee
Flora of Virginia